Hedwig of Legnica (ca. 1351 – 1 August 1409) was a Polish princess and member of the Piast dynasty, in the Legnica branch. By marriage Hedwig was Duchess of Żagań.

She was the fourth child and only daughter of Wenceslaus I, Duke of Legnica and his wife Anna, daughter of Casimir I, Duke of Cieszyn.

Life
Hedwig married on 10 February 1372 to Henry VI the Older, Duke of Głogów-Żagań. Their union was an unhappy one; after the premature death of their only daughter, the Ducal couple became formally separated. Hedwig remained in Żagań and Henry VI moved to Krosno Odrzańskie, where he died on 5 December 1393.

Despite their many years of estrangement, in his will Henry VI left all his lands to Hedwig as her dower, these included the towns of: Żagań, Krosno Odrzańskie and Świebodzin. Hedwig ruled over the lands until 1403, when she renounced her government over them on behalf of Henry VI's nephews.

References

Chronological Dates in Stoyan

1350s births
1409 deaths
Polish Roman Catholics
Piast dynasty